Putilla is a genus of sea snails, marine gastropod mollusks in the family Seguenziidae.

Species
Species within the genus Putilla include:
 Putilla lacuna (Laseron, 1954)
 Putilla lucida A. Adams, 1867
 † Putilla ponderi (Maxwell, 1992) 
 Putilla porcellana (Tate & May, 1900)
 † Putilla tantilla (Laws, 1936)
Species brought into synonymy
 Putilla abyssicola Nordsieck, 1972: synonym of Benthonella tenella (Jeffreys, 1869)
 Putilla aoteana (Powell, 1937): synonym of Notosetia aoteana Powell, 1937
 Putilla cantrainei Nordsieck, 1972: synonym of Obtusella intersecta (S. Wood, 1857)
 Putilla messanensis (Aradas & Benoit, 1876): synonym of Rissoa messanensis Aradas & Benoit, 1876
 Putilla neozelanica (Suter, 1908): synonym of Notosetia neozelanica (Suter, 1898)

References

  Adams A. (1867) Descriptions of new species of shells from Japan. Proceedings of the Zoological society of London, 1867: 309-315, pl. 19

External links
 Ponder W. F. (1985). A review of the Genera of the Rissoidae (Mollusca: Mesogastropoda: Rissoacea). Records of the Australian Museum supplement 4: 1-221 page(s): 100
 Kano Y., Chikyu, E. & Warén, A. (2009) Morphological, ecological and molecular characterization of the enigmatic planispiral snail genus Adeuomphalus (Vetigastropoda: Seguenzioidea). Journal of Molluscan Studies, 75:397-418.

 
Gastropod genera